Mahmoud Fustuq (1936 – 8 February 2006) was a Lebanese businessman who had various companies in Saudi Arabia. He was known for being brother-in-law of former Saudi Arabian ruler King Abdullah and for his involvement in the horse business.

Biography
Fustuq was born in Lebanon in 1936. His family are from Palestine. He was the eldest of nine siblings. He attended the University of Oklahoma in the late 1950s and received a degree in petroleum engineering. His sister, Aida, married King Abdullah. 

Fustuq had varied businesses in Saudi Arabia. He acquired the Buckram Oak Farm near Lexington, Kentucky, in 1978 which he sold in 2005. He also owned other farms in Ocala, Florida, and Kentucky where he had race horses, including Star Gallant who won the Illinois Derby in 1982 and Silver Train, who won a Breeder's Cup race. His other prominent horses were Najran, Silver Hawk Siberian Summer and Green Forest.

He died in Pompano Beach, Florida, on 8 February 2006 in a traffic accident. He was buried in Saudi Arabia.

Controversy

In the 1970s Fustuq acquired a commission from British Leyland following the sale of a fleet of Land Rovers by the company to the Saudi Arabian National Guard headed by Prince Abdullah, later King Abdullah. The Guardian reported that after this transaction he bought the farms in the USA and a mansion in near Chantilly, France.

References

20th-century Lebanese businesspeople
21st-century Lebanese businesspeople
1936 births
2006 deaths
Racehorse owners and breeders
University of Oklahoma alumni
Road incident deaths in Florida
Owners of a Breeders' Cup winner
Lebanese engineers
Petroleum engineers